Baburi Andijani or Andizani (Baburi Al-Barin, Persian: بابری اندیجان) (1486 – April 1526) was a captured slave of Mughal Emperor Zahiruddin Muhammad Babur and his secret lover, whom he rescued from the camp market in Uzbekistan, in 1499. For coming from the city of Andijan, Emperor Babur preferred to call him Andijani. No more is known about Baburi. Although Baburi is rarely mentioned in other historical texts, the emperor mentions his secret lover, Baburi, many times in his autobiography "Babarnama" and expresses his feelings towards Baburi without fear, and even writes several Persian poems about him.

Early life and career 
In 1499, Andizani came into the custody of Emperor Babur. The Emperor taught Andizani to ride a horse and put him in charge of the stable, keeping him as a faithful and constant companion. In May 1507, contempt for the Emperor drove Baburi to leave, returning only in 1522.

Baburi in Baburnama 
Although famous emperors often kept their feelings secret, Emperor Babur fearlessly expressed his feelings towards Baburi.

Baburi in other literature 
Baburi is a character in Alex Rutherford's historical fiction series Empire of the Moghul which is based on Babur.

References 

1486 births
1526 deaths
People from Andijan
Indian slaves
Male lovers of royalty